Cecil Calvert is a unionist politician in Northern Ireland, and long-serving councillor on Lisburn City Council.

Calvert worked for the B Specials Constabulary and as a farmer before joining the Democratic Unionist Party (DUP). In 1985, he was elected to Lisburn Borough Council, representing Killultagh, County Antrim. He held his seat at each subsequent election, serving as Mayor of Lisburn in 2004 – 05.

Calvert was elected to the Northern Ireland Forum, representing Lagan Valley, but failed to take a seat at the 1998 Northern Ireland Assembly election.

Calvert carried a Union Jack during a St Patrick's Day parade in Seattle in 2005.

In June 2007, Calvert resigned from the DUP, objecting to the party's decision to enter government with Sinn Féin. He subsequently joined Traditional Unionist Voice (TUV) but resigned in March 2011.

References

Living people
Ulster Special Constabulary officers
Farmers from Northern Ireland
Democratic Unionist Party councillors
Traditional Unionist Voice politicians
Members of Lisburn City Council
Mayors of places in Northern Ireland
Members of the Northern Ireland Forum
Year of birth missing (living people)